Arsenaria caidalis is a species of snout moth in the genus Arsenaria. It was described by George Hampson in 1900 and is found in Algeria, Morocco, Tunisia and the United Arab Emirates.

The larvae feed on Halocnemum strobilaceum.

References

Moths described in 1900
Hypotiini
Moths of Africa
Moths of Asia